Longguan Township is a township in Yinzhou District, Ningbo, People's Republic of China, situated in a valley about  southwest of downtown Ningbo. , it has one residential community (社区) and 10 villages under its administration.

See also 
 List of township-level divisions of Zhejiang

References 

Townships of Zhejiang
Yinzhou District, Ningbo